Alvin H. Perlmutter, Director of The Independent Production Fund, has produced television programming for over thirty years.

Prior to forming his own company, Mr. Perlmutter served as NBC News Vice President and earlier as Director of Public Affairs Programming and Program Manager of WNBC-TV, New York. He is the recipient of six Emmys and five Ace awards for excellence in programming on cable television. Perlmutter has produced award-winning documentaries including: NET Journal, The Creative Spirit, Joseph Campbell and the Power of Myth, Native Land, The World of Abnormal Psychology, and The Emperor’s Eye: Art and Power in Industrial China.

Perlmutter is the president of Alvin H. Perlmutter Inc., which produces "Adam Smith's Money World" for WNET. He was the creator and executive producer of The Great American Dream Machine and other programs for public television.

Biography

Mr. Perlmutter graduated from Syracuse University. He is a son of the late Jennie and Fred Perlmutter.

In 1994, he married Joan Konner, dean of the Columbia University Graduate School of Journalism. Konner and Perlmutter co-produced  the documentary Joseph Campbell and the Power of Myth.

He is President of Alvin H. Perlmutter, Inc., a television production company and Chair
and CEO of Sunrise Media LLC, a television and educational news film archive. He has originated more than a hundred PBS documentaries.

American film producers
American television producers
Living people
Year of birth missing (living people)